, also known by his Chinese style name , was a Ryukyuan prince who served as sessei, a post often translated as "prime minister", from 1589 to 1610.

Shō Kō was the second son of Shō I (Prince Yonagusuku Chōken) and Shuriōkimi Aji-ganashi. He was also the little brother of King Shō Nei.

Satsuma invaded Ryukyu in the spring of 1609. Shō Kō was taken to Sunpu together with King Shō Nei and a number of high officials by Satsuma troops. He died and was buried there.

|-

People of the Ryukyu Kingdom
1578 births
1610 deaths
Princes of Ryūkyū
Ryukyuan people
Sessei
16th-century Ryukyuan people
17th-century Ryukyuan people